The Beautiful Afar is a "winged expression" (i.e. a catchphrase or a phraseme) in the Russian language. It was first used by Nikolai Gogol in the novel Dead Souls, published in 1842. The expression is used humorously and/or ironically, to refer to the possibly fictitious place of well-being, where a person who is not burdened with routine rests NS leads a carefree, unburdened, and idle lifestyle.

History 
Dead Souls was mostly written while Gogol was residing abroad, mainly in Italy and Germany, but also in France, Switzerland, and Austria. In one of the novel's lyrical digressions, in the second chapter of the first volume, the author exclaims: "Rus'! Rus’! It's you that I see, from my wonderful, beautiful afar, I see YOU." These lines were written in Italy. By self-admission, Gogol loved Italy and called it 'my dear soul'. In a letter to Zhukovsky he writes: "If you knew with what joy I abandoned Switzerland and flew to my dear soul - Italy. She is mine! No one in the world will take her from me."

As an idiomatic expression, "The Beautiful Afar" was coined by Vissarion Belinsky, in the argument against Gogol himself. Belinsky attacked Gogol with an angry letter dated July 3 (15), 1847, about Gogol's journalistic book "Selected Places from Correspondence with Friends" published in the same year:

References

Idioms
Russian literature
Russian language